Sar Kamar or Sarkamar may refer to:
 Sar Kamar, Chaharmahal and Bakhtiari
 Sar Kamar, Dehloran, Ilam Province